The Enrico Fermi Prize, first awarded in 2001, is given by the Italian Physical Society (Società Italiana di Fisica).  It is a yearly award of €30,000 honoring one or more Members of the Society who have "particularly honoured physics with their discoveries."

Recipients

See also

 List of physics awards

References

Awards established in 2001
Italian science and technology awards
Physics awards
Enrico Fermi